Simone Boye Sørensen (born 3 March 1992) is a Danish professional footballer who plays as a defender for Hammarby IF and the Denmark national team.

Club career
Raised in Regstrup, near Holbæk, Boye began playing football with Jernløse IF. She has a weakness in her eardrums which causes them to perforate easily.

In 2012, Boye attended the University of Texas at San Antonio, where she played college soccer for the UTSA Roadrunners. Boye later returned to her Danish club BSF after the American season.

Boye signed for Brøndby IF in the Danish Elitedivisionen in 2013 and was deployed as a central midfielder at club level. Equally comfortable defending or attacking, she represented Brøndby in the UEFA Women's Champions League. She was voted 2014 Danish Football Player of the Year. She was later appointed captain of Brøndby. In June 2017, she signed for FC Rosengård in Damallsvenskan.

On 22 July 2021, it was announced that Boye had signed for English side Arsenal.

On 14 July 2022, Boye joined Hammarby IF, signing a three and a half-year deal.

International career
Boye made her debut for the senior Denmark women's national football team in December 2011, a 4–0 win over Chile at the São Paulo International Tournament. She entered play as a substitute for Mariann Gajhede Knudsen on 83 minutes.

An injury sustained at the 2013 Algarve Cup kept Boye out of contention for a place in Denmark's squad for UEFA Women's Euro 2013. In November 2014, it was reported that national coach Nils Nielsen was building his team around Boye, who had shown some of the same defensive qualities as Denmark's male captain Daniel Agger.

In 2017, Boye was named to Denmark's UEFA Women's Euro 2017 squad.

Career statistics
Scores and results list Denmark's goal tally first, score column indicates score after each Boye goal.

Honours 
Brøndby IF
 Elitedivisionen: 2014–15, 2016–17; runner-up 2013–14, 2015–16
 Danish Women's Cup: 2013–14, 2014–15, 2016–17; runner-up 2015–16

FC Rosengård
 Damallsvenskan: runner-up 2017
 Svenska Cupen: 2017, 2018

References

External links 

 
 Danish national team profile 

1992 births
Living people
Danish women's footballers
Denmark women's international footballers
Brøndby IF (women) players
FC Bayern Munich (women) players
Arsenal W.F.C. players
Hammarby Fotboll (women) players
Danish expatriate sportspeople in the United States
Expatriate sportspeople in Germany
Danish expatriate women's footballers
Expatriate women's soccer players in the United States
People from Holbæk Municipality
Women's association football defenders
UTSA Roadrunners women's soccer players
FC Rosengård players
Damallsvenskan players
Frauen-Bundesliga players
Women's Super League players
Sportspeople from Region Zealand
UEFA Women's Euro 2022 players
UEFA Women's Euro 2017 players
Association football defenders